The 2012–13 Polska Liga Hokejowa season was the 78th season of the Polska Liga Hokejowa, the top level of ice hockey in Poland. Eight teams participated in the league, and KS Cracovia won the championship. 

Due to financial difficulties, KS Toruń pulled out from competition after 14 matches. They did not participate in the playoffs, and they were relegated to the 1. Liga.

Regular season

Playoffs

Placing round

External links 
 Polish Ice Hockey Federation

Polska Hokej Liga seasons
Polska
Polska